Mireille Levert (born December 20, 1956) is a Canadian writer and illustrator of children's books, living in Quebec. 

She was born in Saint-Jean-sur-Richelieu and studied plastic arts at the Université du Québec à Montréal, graduating in 1979. She was a founding member of the Association des illustrateurs et illustratrices du Québec. Levert taught illustration at the Université du Québec à Montréal from 1997 to 2002. She lives and works in Montreal.

She took part in the International Biennial of Children's Books in Barcelona.

Selected works 
 La Giraffe, children's book, illustrated by Levert, text by Cécile Cloutier (1984)
 Passing time, children's book, illustrated by Levert, text by Christiane L'Heureux (1987)
 Jérémie et Mme Ming, children's book, illustrated by Levert, text by Sharon Jennings (1990) shortlisted for the Governor General's Award for French-language children's illustration
 Sleep Tight Mrs. Ming, children's book, illustrated by Levert, text by Sharon Jennings (1993) awarded the Governor General's Award for English-language children's illustration
 Little Red Riding Hood, children's book (1995)
 An Island in the Soup, children's book (2001) awarded the Governor General's Award for English-language children's illustration
 Émile Pantalon, children's book (2005) finalist for the Marilyn Baillie Picture Book Award
 The Princess Who Had Almost Everything, children's book (2006)
 Quand j'écris avec mon cœur, children's poetry (2014), shortlisted for the Governor General's Award for French-language children's illustration
 Un jour je bercerai la terre, children's poetry (2017)

References 

1956 births
Living people
Canadian women children's writers
Governor General's Award-winning children's illustrators
People from Saint-Jean-sur-Richelieu
Université du Québec à Montréal alumni
Academic staff of the Université du Québec à Montréal
Writers from Quebec